A referendum on introducing prohibition was held in Norway on 5 and 6 October 1919. Partial prohibition had been in effect since 1917, and the prohibition proposal did not include all types of alcohol, only spirits. The proposal was approved by 61.6% of voters. A second referendum on whether the prohibition should be maintained was held in 1926, resulting in an overturning of the law.

Results

By county

References

External links
Norwegian Bureau of Statistics

Referendums in Norway
Norway
1919 in Norway
Prohibition in Norway
Prohibition referendums
October 1919 events